Fresnes-lès-Montauban is a commune in the Pas-de-Calais department in the Hauts-de-France region of France.

Geography
Junction 16 of the A1 autoroute is within a few yards of the commune.

Population

Places of interest
 The church of Notre-Dame, rebuilt, as was much of the village, after World War I.

See also
Communes of the Pas-de-Calais department

References

Fresneslesmontauban